Shireen Dalvi, also credited as Shirin Dalvi, is an Indian journalist and is the Editor of the Mumbai edition of Urdu language newspaper Avadhnama. She is the only women Editor of an Urdu language newspaper. She was arrested for reprinting the cartoons published by Charlie Hebdo following complaints and threats of protests from Rashtriya Ulema Council and was later released on bail.

References 

Living people
Journalists from Maharashtra
Indian newspaper editors
Indian women journalists
Writers from Mumbai
Urdu-language writers from India
Women newspaper editors
Year of birth missing (living people)